Lotfi Benzarti is a Tunisian football manager.

References

Year of birth missing (living people)
Living people
Tunisian football managers
Al-Wehda Club (Mecca) managers
Khaleej FC managers
Najran SC managers
Baniyas SC managers
Al Kharaitiyat SC managers
Emirates Club managers
Al-Ittihad Kalba SC managers
US Monastir (football) managers
Tunisian Ligue Professionnelle 1 managers
Tunisian expatriate football managers
Expatriate football managers in the United Arab Emirates
Tunisian expatriate sportspeople in the United Arab Emirates
Expatriate football managers in Qatar
Tunisian expatriate sportspeople in Qatar
Expatriate football managers in Saudi Arabia
Tunisian expatriate sportspeople in Saudi Arabia
Saudi Professional League managers
UAE Pro League managers